Minuscule 808 (in the Gregory-Aland numbering), δ203 (von Soden), is a Greek minuscule manuscript of the New Testament written on parchment. Palaeographically it has been assigned to the 14th century. It contains liturgical books and marginalia. The manuscript has complex contents.

Description 
The codex contains the whole text of the New Testament, on 414 parchment leaves (size ).

The text is written in one column per page, 30 lines per page.

The text of the four Gospels is divided according to the Ammonian Sections (in Mark 241, the last section in 16:9), with references to the Eusebian Canons.

The order of books is usual for the Greek manuscripts: Gospels, Acts, Catholic epistles, Pauline epistles (Philemon precede Hebrews), and Apocalypse.

Text 
The Greek text of the codex is a representative of the Byzantine text-type. Hermann von Soden included it to the textual family Kx. Aland placed it in Category V.

According to the Claremont Profile Method it represents textual family Kx in Luke 1 and Luke 20. In Luke 10 no profile was made. It belongs to the textual cluster 1345.

History 
According to Gregory the manuscript was written in the 12th century. The manuscript is currently dated by the INTF to the 14th century.

It was added to the list of New Testament manuscripts by Gregory (808e). Gregory saw the manuscript in 1886.

Text of the Apocalypse was collated by Herman C. Hoskier.

The manuscript is now housed at the library of the National Library of Greece (2251) in Athens.

See also 

 List of New Testament minuscules
 Biblical manuscript
 Textual criticism
 Minuscule 803

References

Further reading 

 
 H. C. Hoskier, Concerning the Text of the Apocalypse: Collation of All Existing Available Greek Documents with the Standard Text of Stephen’s Third Edition Together with the Testimony of Versions, Commentaries and Fathers. 1 vol. (London: Bernard Quaritch, Ltd., 1929), pp. 509–513.

External links 
 Minuscule 808 at the National Library of Greece

Greek New Testament minuscules
14th-century biblical manuscripts
Manuscripts of the National Library of Greece